Vladimir Lenin (1870–1924) was a Russian Bolshevik leader who was the founder and head of government of the Soviet Union.

Lenin may also refer to:
Lenin (1916 icebreaker)
Lenin (1957 icebreaker)
Lenin (novel), by Alan Brien
Çinarlı, Shamkir or Lenin, a village in Azerbaijan
 Lenin (horse)

People with the given name
Kottawa Iniyage Saman Thusitha Lenin Kumara (b. 1980), Sri Lankan Sinhala folk musician
Lenin Arroyo (born 1979), Costa Rican American boxer
Lenín Moreno (born 1953), 46th President of Ecuador
Len Picota (born Lenin Picota in 1966), Panamanian baseball pitcher
Lenin Rajendran (1951-2019), Indian film director
Lenin Porozo (born 1990), Ecuadorian football player 
Lenin Preciado (born 1993), Ecuadorian judoka
Lenin Raghuvanshi (born 1970), Indian Dalit rights activist 
Lenin Steenkamp (born 1969), South African football player
Ali Lenin Aguilera (born 1967), Venezuelan lawyer and entrepreneur
Gilbert Lenin Castillo (born 1988), Dominican boxer
Quiarol Arzú or Quiarol Lenín Arzú Flores (born 1985), football player from Honduras
B. Lenin (born 1947/1948), Indian film editor, writer and director
Cherukuri Lenin (1985/1986–2010), Indian archer
Lalitha Lenin (born 1946), Indian poet
Lenin Mancuso, Italian police officer and victim of the Sicilian Mafia (died 1979)

See also
Lehnin
Leninsky (disambiguation) (Leninskaya, Leninskoye)
Lenine (disambiguation)
Lennon (disambiguation)
List of places named after Vladimir Lenin
Vladimir Ilyich Lenin (poem), a poem by Vladimir Mayakovsky